Aldermaston Soke is a hamlet that lies on the county boundary between Berkshire and Hampshire, and is administratively part of the civil parish of Mortimer West End, which was transferred from Berkshire to Hampshire in 1879.

Archaeological interest
The settlement lies on marshy ground at the bottom of a valley, very near Silchester (Roman Calleva Atrebatum). The modern road follows the course of a Roman road through the hamlet, diverging either side of it. It has been suggested that the dampness of the ground led to a short section of Roman road remaining in use in Aldermaston Soke as a causeway through the valley bottom.

Botanical interest

The damp ground also makes the location of interest to botanists, as a number of plant species that are rare in Britain have been attested here: 
 Hypericum maculatum (a species of St John's wort)
 Viola palustris (Marsh violet)
 Lythrum portula (a species of Loosestrife)
 Hieracium umbellatum and 
 Hieracium acuminatum (two species of Hawkweed)
 Dactylorhiza praetermissa (Southern Marsh-orchid)

Aldermaston Soke has a site of Special Scientific Interest (SSSI) just to the west. It is called Decoy Pit, Pools and Woods.

See also
Aldermaston

References

External links
Ordnance survey map showing Aldermaston Soke and course of the Roman road, at www.streetmap.co.uk. Accessed 10 February 2008.

External links

Villages in Hampshire